Lukashenko is Belarusian and Ukrainian surname which means "son of Lukash", the native form of the given name Luke. Notable people with this surname include:
 Alexander Lukashenko (1954), president of Belarus since 1994
 Dmitry Lukashenko (1980), second son of Alexander Lukashenko
 Galina Lukashenko (1955), wife of Alexander Lukashenko
 Nikolay Lukashenko (2004), third son of Alexander Lukashenko
 Viktor Lukashenko (1975), first son of Alexander Lukashenko
 Volodymyr Lukashenko (1980), Ukrainian sabre fencer.

See also
 

Ukrainian-language surnames
Patronymic surnames
Surnames from given names